Berlin-Charlottenburg is a railway station in the Charlottenburg district of Berlin. The U-Bahn station Wilmersdorfer Straße (U7) can be reached via short footpath.

History

The station was opened on 7 February 1882 as the western endpoint of the Stadtbahn line in the then independent town of Charlottenburg. From here the Berlin-Blankenheim railway ran southwestwards, a section of the Kanonenbahn rail route to Metz in Alsace-Lorraine.

The old station hall was damaged in World War II and only provisionally repaired afterwards. During the Cold War era parts of the track installations were reserved for the deployment of British Forces in Berlin. The station was the Berlin terminus for the British Military Train ("The Berliner") which carried allied military and diplomatic passengers across the GDR to Braunschweig in West Germany. 

When nearby Wilmersdorfer Straße was converted into a pedestrian zone, a new railway underpass was built at the site of the old station hall, which was then completely demolished and rebuilt, with the replacement opening on 6 July 1971. After the East German Deutsche Reichsbahn state railway passed the West Berlin S-Bahn network to the Berliner Verkehrsbetriebe (BVG) public transport company, Charlottenburg Station in the early morning of 9 January 1984 was the starting point of the first BVG operated train.

In 2003 the distance to the U-Bahn station Wilmersdorfer Straße was shortened by shifting the two S-Bahn platforms about  further to the east and the opening of a new eastern entrance near the corner of the shopping street. In recent years the tracks have been equipped with noise barriers and the 1970s entrance building has been thermally refurbished.

Train services
The station is served by the following services:

Regional services  Magdeburg – Brandenburg – Potsdam – Berlin – Fürstenwalde – Frankfurt (Oder) (– Cottbus)
Regional services  Dessau – Bad Belzig – Michendorf – Berlin – Berlin-Schönefeld Airport – Wünsdorf-Waldstadt
Local services  Nauen – Falkensee – Berlin – Berlin-Schönefeld Airport
Local services  Wustermark – Golm – Potsdam – Berlin
Local services  Königs Wusterhausen – Berlin-Schönefeld Airport – Saarmund – Golm – Potsdam – Berlin
Berlin S-Bahn services  Spandau - Westkreuz – Hauptbahnhof – Alexanderplatz – Ostbahnhof – Karlshorst – Köpenick – Erkner
Berlin S-Bahn services  Westkreuz - Hauptbahnhof - Alexanderplatz - Ostbahnhof - Lichtenberg - Strausberg Nord
Berlin S-Bahn services  Potsdam - Wannsee - Westkreuz - Hauptbahnhof - Alexanderplatz - Ostbahnhof - Lichtenberg - Ahrensfelde
Berlin S-Bahn services  Spandau - Westkreuz - Hauptbahnhof - Alexanderplatz - Ostbahnhof - Schöneweide - Flughafen Schönefeld

References

Railway stations in Berlin
Berlin S-Bahn stations
Buildings and structures in Charlottenburg-Wilmersdorf
Railway stations in Germany opened in 1882